Pak Nam-chol (born October 3, 1988) is a North Korean international football player.

Pak has appeared for the Korea DPR national football team in 4 FIFA World Cup qualifying matches.

References

External links

 
 
 Pak Nam-chol at DPRKFootball

1988 births
Living people
North Korean footballers
North Korea international footballers
Amnokgang Sports Club players
2010 FIFA World Cup players
2011 AFC Asian Cup players
Association football central defenders
Footballers at the 2010 Asian Games
Asian Games competitors for North Korea